Mambila massacre was a reported 2017 massacre of Fulani herdsmen in Mambila Plateau, Nigeria.

The nature of the killings is disputed, and few independent sources (other than residents) exist, apparently, with the Buhari administration accused of ignoring news of, or otherwise not sufficiently focusing on this incident, possibly due to the unusual nature of the attacks (herdsmen usually being accused of massacres).

This was followed a smaller outbreak of violence months later.

References

 

2018 murders in Nigeria
2010s massacres in Nigeria
June 2017 crimes in Africa
Fula history
Massacres of ethnic groups
Massacres in 2018